The ventral lateral nucleus (VL) is a nucleus in the ventral nuclear group of the thalamus.

Inputs and outputs
It receives neuronal inputs from the basal ganglia which includes the substantia nigra and the globus pallidus (via the thalamic fasciculus). It also has inputs from the cerebellum (via the dentatothalamic tract). 

It sends neuronal output to the primary motor cortex and premotor cortex.

The ventral lateral nucleus in the thalamus forms the motor functional division in the thalamic nuclei along with the ventral anterior nucleus. The ventral lateral nucleus receives motor information from the cerebellum and the globus pallidus. Output from the ventral lateral nucleus then goes to the primary motor cortex.

Functions
The function of the ventral lateral nucleus is to target efferents including the motor cortex, premotor cortex, and supplementary motor cortex.  Therefore, its function helps the coordination and planning of movement. It also plays a role in the learning of movement.

Clinical significance
A lesion of the VL has been associated with synesthesia.

Additional images

References

External links
 

Thalamus